Liberty High School is located in Brentwood, California, United States. Liberty High School is a comprehensive 9–12 grade high school serving approximately 2800 students. It was founded in 1902 as Liberty Union High School.

Overview
Liberty is organized into four Small Learning Communities (SLC). SLC leadership teams include an Assistant Principal, Counselor, SLC coordinator and Academy Director. Career specific academy programs are available to students in grades 10 through 12. These programs highlight Business and Technology, Health Careers, Teaching and Learning Careers, Arts and Humanities.

Liberty is well known for their Student Learning Careers, such as the TLC academy for students who plan on childcare or  teaching careers, as well as their PADA academy for art-oriented students. In 2017, Liberty High PADA students completed a public beautification project in Oak Meadow Park by crafting a mural.

Liberty High School's official newspaper is The Lion's Roar. This quarterly publication is typically eight pages in length and is produced by approximately twenty students enrolled in Journalism. It was the second place bracket winner of the American Scholastic Press Association's newspaper competition in 2014 and 2015.

Notable alumni

 Chris Gruler, drafted #1 by the Cincinnati Reds, 3rd overall in the 2002 Major League Baseball Draft, minor league baseball pitcher
 Brent Mydland  keyboardist and vocalist for the Grateful Dead from 1979 to 1990.
 Matt Riley, drafted in the 3rd round by the Baltimore Orioles in the 1997 Major League Baseball Draft
 Lisa Joann Thompson, dancer, actress, and choreographer, starred in In Living Color, Fame L.A., and Motown Live

Athletics 
Liberty High School's teams are known as the Lions. Liberty competes in the Bay Valley Athletic League, and North Coast Section of the California Interscholastic Federation.

Sports
Sports teams offered include:
Baseball
Basketball (boys freshman, junior varsity and varsity; girls freshman, junior varsity and varsity)
Cross Country
Football (freshman, junior varsity and varsity)
Golf (boys varsity and girls varsity)
Soccer (boys junior varsity and varsity; girls junior varsity and varsity)
Softball (freshman, junior varsity and varsity)
Stunt
Swimming 
Tennis (boys varsity and girls varsity)
Track and Field
Unified sports (soccer and bowling)
Volleyball (boys and girls)
Waterpolo (boys and girls)
Wrestling (freshman, junior varsity and varsity)

State championships
Liberty won their first CIF state football championship in 2018.

References

External links
Official Liberty High School website
California Public Schools Report
Liberty Lions Roar Website

High schools in Contra Costa County, California
Brentwood, California
Public high schools in California
Educational institutions established in 1901
1901 establishments in California